The New Jersey Administrative Code (N.J.A.C.) is the codification of all rules and regulations made by the executive branch agencies of New Jersey.

Newly proposed rules are published for comment in the New Jersey Register, which is published twice a month. Once the new rules are officially adopted, they are published in the Code. Responsibility for the compilation, publication, and updating of the Code lies with the New Jersey Office of Administrative Law (OAL).  All rules and regulations must be made in accordance with the New Jersey Administrative Procedure Act and the OAL's Rules for Agency Rulemaking.

Titles
 Title 1. Administrative Law
 Title 2. Agriculture
 Title 3. Banking
 Title 4A. Civil Service
 Title 5. Community Affairs
 Title 5A. Military And Veterans' Affairs
 Title 6. Education
 Title 6A. Education
 Title 7. Environmental Protection
 Title 8. Health And Senior Services
 Title 9. Higher Education
 Title 9A. Higher Education
 Title 10. Human Services
 Title 10A. Corrections
 Title 11. Insurance
 Title 12. Labor And Workforce Development
 Title 12A. Commerce
 Title 13. Law And Public Safety
 Title 14. Public Utilities
 Title 14A. Energy
 Title 15. State
 Title 15A. Public Advocate
 Title 16. Transportation
 Title 17. Treasury -- General
 Title 18. Treasury -- Taxation
 Title 19. Other Agencies
 Title 19K. Casino Control Commission/Casino Reinvestment Development Authority

The appendices to the Code also contain tables correlating rules and statutes, the executive orders of the State's governors, and a definition table.

See also
 Law of New Jersey
 Code of Federal Regulations
 United States administrative law

References

External links
 New Jersey Administrative Code from LexisNexis

Administrative Code
New Jersey